is a freestyle wrestler from Japan who won the world title in the 55 kg division in 2014.

Championships and accomplishments
Tokyo Sports
Wrestling Special Award (2014)

References

1992 births
Living people
Japanese female sport wrestlers
World Wrestling Championships medalists
21st-century Japanese women